Jer-Kazar is a village in the Ysyk-Ata District of Chüy Region of Kyrgyzstan established in 1928. Its population was 2,021 in 2021.

References

Populated places in Chüy Region